PMOS (or pMOS) may refer to:

 PMOS logic
 p-channel MOSFET
 Prime Minister's Official Spokesman
 Primary Military Occupational Specialty
 The United States Marine Band, nicknamed the President's Own
 PostmarketOS, a free and open-source operating system based on Linux

See also
 PMOs as project management offices or organizations